Ketipramine (G-35,259), also known as ketimipramine or ketoimipramine, is a tricyclic antidepressant (TCA) that was tested in clinical trials for the treatment of depression in the 1960s but was never marketed. It differs from imipramine in terms of chemical structure only by the addition of a ketone group, to the azepine ring, and is approximately equivalent in effectiveness as an antidepressant in comparison.

It was one of the drugs prescribed by Roland Kuhn in a series of unethical experiments to test drugs on children without informed consent and without proper approval at the psychiatric hospital in Münsterlingen, Switzerland.

See also 
 Tricyclic antidepressant

References 

Dimethylamino compounds
Antidepressants
Dibenzazepines
Ketones
Tricyclic antidepressants